Allantus is a genus of sawflies of the family Tenthredinidae.

List of species
Species within this genus include:
 Allantus balteatus (Klug, 1814) 
 Allantus basalis (Klug, 1814) 
 Allantus calceatus (Klug, 1814) 
 Allantus calliblepharus (Konow, 1900) 
 Allantus cinctus (Linnaeus, 1758) - Curled Rose Sawfly 
 Allantus cingillipes (Kontuniemi, 1947) 
 Allantus cingillum (Klug, 1814) 
 Allantus cingulatus (Scopoli, 1763) 
 Allantus coryli (Stritt, 1937) 
 Allantus coxalis (Klug, 1814) 
 Allantus didymus (Klug, 1818) 
 Allantus laticinctus (Serville, 1823) 
 Allantus melanarius (Klug, 1814) 
 Allantus rufocinctus (Retzius, 1783) 
 Allantus togatus Panzer, 1801 
 Allantus truncatus (Klug, 1814) 
 Allantus viennensis (Schrank, 1781) 
 Allantus xanthopygus (Klug, 1818)

References

Sawfly genera
Tenthredinidae